Following is a list of municipal presidents of Zacatecas City, in the Mexican state of Zacatecas:

References

Zacatecas City